The Orchestra Mozart Academy (Italian: Accademia dell'Orchestra Mozart) is an Italian chamber orchestra based in Bologna.

Creation 
The orchestra was created in 2004 by Claudio Abbado as a special project for young musicians within the Regia Accademia Filarmonica (Philharmonic Academy) of Bologna  and managed by Giuseppe Modugno and Caterina Coretti.

The orchestra gave several concerts in Italy and abroad.

Composition 
The orchestra is basically a chamber orchestra.
However, the number of musicians sometimes exceed this format: in the concert performed on May 9, 2010 in the Church of the Holy Cross, Augsburg, the orchestra played Mozart and Gibelli – conducted by Boris Schaefer – with trumpets, timpani, choir and soloists .

The orchestra acts as a meeting-place for young musicians from many countries, selected every 2–3 years by experienced musicians like the violinists Giuliano Carmignola and Gisella Curtolo, Raphael Christ, Cristiano Rossi, the viola player Danusha Waskiewicz, the cello players , Walter Vestidello, Gabriele Geminiani, the double-bass players Alois Posch, Lutz Schumacher, the flautists Jacques Zoon and Andrea Oliva, the oboist Lucas Macias Navarro, the clarinet player Alessandro Carbonare,  and many others.

Conductors and soloists 
Orchestra Mozart Academy was conducted, among the others, by Boris Schaefer, Giuliano Carmignola, Sergej Krylov, Alexander Lonquich, Jacques Zoon, Lorenza Borrani, Alessandro Carbonare, Enrico Bronzi, Lucas Macias Navarro and many others.

Recordings 
The orchestra conducted by Enrico Bronzi is featured on a CD edited by Italian musical review Amadeus with music of C. P. E. Bach

Performed on May 9, 2010 in the Church of the Holy Cross, Augsburg, and recorded by Radio Bavaria, Munich (BR) with Christiane Karg (soprano), Angela Brower (alto), Andreas Post (tenor), Günter Papendell (bass), the Augsburg Cathedral Boy Choir and the Accademia dell'Orchestra Mozart; conductor: Boris Schäfer

References

External links 
 

Italian orchestras
2004 establishments in Italy
Musical groups established in 2004
Bologna
Mozart music ensembles